Wadley is a city in Jefferson County, Georgia, United States. The population was 2,061 at the 2010 census.

History
The community was named for William Morill Wadley, a railroad official.

The Georgia General Assembly incorporated Wadley as a town in 1876. It was incorporated as a city in 1970.

Geography

Wadley is located at  (32.870491, -82.403756).

Demographics

2020 census

As of the 2020 United States census, there were 1,643 people, 654 households, and 381 families residing in the city.

2000 census
As of the census of 2000, there were 2,088 people, 765 households, and 516 families living in the city. The racial makeup of the city was 77.11% African American, 20.26% White,  0.14% Native American, 0.05% Asian, 1.92% from other races, and 0.53% from two or more races.  2.49% of the population were Hispanic or Latino of any race.

There were 765 households, out of which 35.7% had children under the age of 18 living with them, 31.0% were married couples living together, 31.4% had a female householder with no husband present, and 32.5% were non-families. 30.6% of all households were made up of individuals, and 13.5% had someone living alone who was 65 years of age or older.  The average household size was 2.61 and the average family size was 3.23.

In the city, the population was spread out, with 30.9% under the age of 18, 9.4% from 18 to 24, 25.0% from 25 to 44, 19.3% from 45 to 64, and 15.5% who were 65 years of age or older.  The median age was 34 years.  For every 100 females, there were 79.4 males.  For every 100 females age 18 and over, there were 72.6 males.

The median income for a household in the city was $15,300, and the median income for a family was $20,590. Males had a median income of $21,544 versus $16,895 for females. The per capita income for the city was $9,369.  40.2% of the population and 33.7% of families were below the poverty line.  Out of the total population, 53.1% of those under the age of 18 and 39.3% of those 65 and older were living below the poverty line.

See also

Central Savannah River Area

References

External links
 The News and Farmer and Wadley Herald/ Jefferson Reporter, the county's weekly newspaper and the oldest weekly newspaper in Georgia.

Cities in Georgia (U.S. state)
Cities in Jefferson County, Georgia
1876 establishments in Georgia (U.S. state)
Populated places established in 1876